WBMC (960 AM, The Information Station) is a radio station broadcasting a news talk information format. Licensed to McMinnville, Tennessee, United States, the station is currently owned by Peg Broadcasting, LLC and features programming from CBS News Radio, Salem Radio Network, and Westwood One.

References

External links

News and talk radio stations in the United States
BMC